Xanthopeltis is a genus of lichenized fungi in the family Teloschistaceae. This is a monotypic genus, containing the single species Xanthopeltis rupicola.

References

External links
Xanthopeltis at Index Fungorum

Teloschistales
Lichen genera
Teloschistales genera
Taxa named by Rolf Santesson